Temnothorax corticalis is a species of ant belonging to the family Formicidae.

Synonym:
 Leptothorax corticalis

References

Myrmicinae